Ozun is a commune in Covasna County, Transylvania, Romania composed of seven villages:
Bicfalău / Bikfalva
Lisnău / Lisznyó
Lisnău-Vale / Lisznyópatak
Lunca Ozunului / Vesszőstelep
Măgheruș / Sepsimagyarós
Ozun
Sântionlunca / Szentivánlaborfalva

Demographics

The commune has an absolute Székely Hungarian majority. According to the 2011 census, it has a population of 4,430 of which 82.71% or 3,664 are Hungarian, 11.6% or 514 are Romanian, 2.93% or 130 are Roma, and 0.11% or 5 are part of another ethnic group.

History 

It formed part of the Székely Land region of the historical Transylvania province. Until 1918, the village belonged to the Háromszék County of the Kingdom of Hungary. After the Treaty of Trianon of 1920, it became part of Romania.

References

Communes in Covasna County
Localities in Transylvania